Ground beetles are a large, cosmopolitan family of beetles, the Carabidae, with more than 40,000 species worldwide, around 2,000 of which are found in North America and 2,700 in Europe. As of 2015, it is one of the 10 most species-rich animal families. They belong to the Adephaga. Members of the family are primarily carnivorous, but some members are phytophagous or omnivorous.

Description and ecology
Although their body shapes and coloring vary somewhat, most are shiny black or metallic and have ridged wing covers (elytra). The elytra are fused in some species, particularly the large Carabinae, rendering the beetles unable to fly. The species Mormolyce phyllodes is known as violin beetle due to their peculiarly shaped elytra. All carabids except the quite primitive flanged bombardier beetles (Paussinae) have a groove on their fore leg tibiae bearing a comb of hairs used for cleaning their antennae.

Defensive secretions
Typical for the ancient beetle suborder Adephaga to which they belong, they have paired pygidial glands in the lower back of the abdomen. These are well developed in ground beetles, and produce noxious or even caustic secretions used to deter would-be predators. In some, commonly known as bombardier beetles, these secretions are mixed with volatile compounds and ejected by a small combustion, producing a loud popping sound and a cloud of hot and acrid gas that can injure small mammals, such as shrews, and is liable to kill invertebrate predators outright.

To humans, getting "bombed" by a bombardier beetle is a decidedly unpleasant experience. This ability has evolved independently twice, as it seems, in the flanged bombardier beetles (Paussinae), which are among the most ancient ground beetles, and in the typical bombardier beetles (Brachininae), which are part of a more "modern" lineage. In one of the very few known cases of a vertebrate mimicking an arthropod, juvenile Heliobolus lugubris lizards are similar in color to the aposematic oogpister beetles, and move in a way that makes them look surprisingly similar to the insects at a casual glance.

A folk story claims that Charles Darwin once found himself on the receiving end of a bombardier beetle's attack, based on a passage in his autobiography. Darwin stated in a letter to Leonard Jenyns that a beetle had attacked him on that occasion, but he did not know what kind:

A Cychrus rostratus once squirted into my eye & gave me extreme pain; & I must tell you what happened to me on the banks of the Cam in my early entomological days; under a piece of bark I found two carabi (I forget which) & caught one in each hand, when lo & behold I saw a sacred Panagæus crux major; I could not bear to give up either of my Carabi, & to lose Panagæus was out of the question, so that in despair I gently seized one of the carabi between my teeth, when to my unspeakable disgust & pain the little inconsiderate beast squirted his acid down my throat & I lost both Carabi & Panagæus!

Ecology
Common habitats are under the bark of trees, under logs, or among rocks or sand by the edge of ponds and rivers. Most species are carnivorous and actively hunt for any invertebrate prey they can overpower. Some run swiftly to catch their prey; tiger beetles (Cicindelinae) can sustain speeds of  – in relation to their body length they are among the fastest land animals on Earth. Unlike most Carabidae, which are nocturnal, the tiger beetles are active diurnal hunters and often brightly coloured; they have large eyes and hunt by sight. Ground beetles of the species Promecognathus laevissimus are specialised predators of the cyanide millipede Harpaphe haydeniana, countering the hydrogen cyanide that makes these millipedes poisonous to most carnivores.

Relationship with humans
As predators of invertebrates, including many pests, most ground beetles are considered beneficial organisms. The caterpillar hunters (Calosoma) are famous for their habit of devouring prey in quantity, eagerly feeding on tussock moth (Lymantriidae) caterpillars, processionary caterpillars (Thaumetopoeidae) and woolly worms (Arctiidae), which, due to their urticating hairs, are avoided by most insectivores. Large numbers of the forest caterpillar hunter (C. sycophanta), native to Europe, were shipped to New England for biological control of the gypsy moth (Lymantria dispar) as early as 1905.

A few species are nuisance pests. Zabrus is one of the few herbivorous ground beetle genera, and on rare occasions Zabrus tenebrioides, for example, occurs abundantly enough to cause some damage to grain crops. Large species, usually the Carabinae, can become a nuisance if present in large numbers, particularly during outdoor activities such as camping; they void their defensive secretions when threatened, and in hiding among provisions, their presence may spoil food. Since ground beetles are generally reluctant or even unable to fly, mechanically blocking their potential routes of entry is usually easy. The use of insecticides specifically for carabid intrusion may lead to unfortunate side effects, such as the release of their  secretions, so it generally is not a good idea unless the same applications are intended to exclude ants, parasites or other crawling pests.

Especially in the 19th century and to a lesser extent today, their large size and conspicuous coloration, as well as the odd morphology of some (e.g. the Lebiini), made many ground beetles a popular object of collection and study for professional and amateur coleopterologists. High prices were paid for rare and exotic specimens, and in the early to mid-19th century, a veritable "beetle craze" occurred in England. As mentioned above, Charles Darwin was an ardent collector of beetles when he was about 20 years old, to the extent that he would rather scour the countryside for rare specimens with William Darwin Fox, John Stevens Henslow, and Henry Thompson than to study theology as his father wanted him to do. In his autobiography, he fondly recalled his experiences with Licinus and Panagaeus, and wrote:
No poet ever felt more delight at seeing his first poem published than I did at seeing in Stephen's Illustrations of British Insects the magic words, "captured by C. Darwin, Esq."

Evolution and systematics
Ground beetles evolved in the latter Triassic, having separated from their closest relatives by 200 Mya. The family diversified throughout the Jurassic, and the more advanced lineages, such as the Harpalinae, underwent a vigorous radiation starting in the Cretaceous. The closest living relatives of the ground beetles are the false ground beetles (Trachypachidae) and the tiger beetles (Cicindelidae). They are sometimes even included in the Carabidae as subfamilies or as tribes incertae sedis, but more preferably they are united with the ground beetles in the superfamily Caraboidea, or Geadephaga.

Much research has been done on elucidating the phylogeny of the ground beetles and adjusting systematics and taxonomy accordingly. While no completely firm consensus exists, a few points are generally accepted: The ground beetles seemingly consist of a number of more basal lineages and the extremely diverse Harpalinae, which contain over half the described species and into which several formerly independent families had to be subsumed.

Subfamilies

The taxonomy used here is primarily based on the Catalogue of Life and the Carabcat Database. Other classifications, while generally agreeing with the division into a basal radiation of more primitive lineages and the more advanced group informally called "Carabidae Conjunctae", differ in details. For example, the system used by the Tree of Life Web Project makes little use of subfamilies, listing most tribes as incertae sedis as to subfamily. Fauna Europaea, though, splits rather than lumps the Harpalinae, restricting them to what in the system used here is the tribe Harpalini. The exclusion of Trachypachidae as a separate family is now amply supported, as is the inclusion of Rhysodidae as a subfamily, closely related to Paussinae and Siagoninae.

The exclusive Harpalinae is presented here, because the majority of authors presently use this system, following the Carabidae of the World, Catalogue of Palaearctic Coleoptera, or the Carabcat Database (which is reflected the Catalogue of Life).

Tiger Beetles have historically been treated as a subfamily of Carabidae under the name Cicindelinae, but several studies since 2020 indicated that they should be treated as a family, Cicindelidae, a sister group to Carabidae.

 Anthiinae Bonelli, 1813
 Tribe Anthiini Bonelli, 1813
 Tribe Helluonini Hope, 1838
 Tribe Physocrotaphini Chaudoir, 1863
 Apotominae LeConte, 1853
 Brachininae Bonelli, 1810
 Tribe Brachinini Bonelli, 1810
 Tribe Crepidogastrini Jeannel, 1949
 Broscinae Hope, 1838
 Tribe Broscini Hope, 1838
 Carabinae Linnaeus, 1802
 Tribe Carabini Linnaeus, 1802
 Tribe Cychrini Perty, 1830
 Ctenodactylinae Laporte, 1834
 Tribe Ctenodactylini Laporte, 1834
 Tribe Hexagoniini G.Horn, 1881
 Dryptinae Bonelli, 1810
 Tribe Dryptini Bonelli, 1810
 Tribe Galeritini Kirby, 1825
 Tribe Zuphiini Bonelli, 1810
 Elaphrinae Latreille, 1802
 Gineminae Ball & Shpeley, 2002
 Harpalinae Bonelli, 1810
 Tribe Anisodactylini Lacordaire, 1854
 Tribe Harpalini Bonelli, 1810
 Tribe Pelmatellini Bates, 1882
 Tribe Stenolophini Kirby, 1837
 Hiletinae Schiödte, 1847
 Lebiinae Bonelli, 1810
 Tribe Cyclosomini Laporte, 1834
 Tribe Lachnophorini LeConte, 1853
 Tribe Lebiini Bonelli, 1810
 Tribe Odacanthini Laporte, 1834
 Tribe Perigonini G.Horn, 1881
 Licininae Bonelli, 1810
 Tribe Chaetogenyini Emden, 1958
 Tribe Chlaeniini Brullé, 1834
 Tribe Licinini Bonelli, 1810
 Tribe Oodini LaFerté-Sénectère, 1851
 Loricerinae Bonelli, 1810
 Melaeninae Csiki, 1933
 Migadopinae Chaudoir, 1861
 Tribe Amarotypini Erwin, 1985
 Tribe Migadopini Chaudoir, 1861
 Nebriinae Laporte, 1834
 Tribe Cicindini Csiki, 1927
 Tribe Nebriini Laporte, 1834
 Tribe Notiokasiini Kavanaugh & Nègre, 1983
 Tribe Notiophilini Motschulsky, 1850
 Tribe Opisthiini Dupuis, 1912
 Tribe Pelophilini Kavanaugh, 1996
 Nototylinae Bänninger, 1927
 Omophroninae Bonelli, 1810
 Orthogoniinae Schaum, 1857
 Tribe Amorphomerini Sloane, 1923
 Tribe Idiomorphini Bates, 1891
 Tribe Orthogoniini Schaum, 1857
 Panagaeinae Bonelli, 1810
 Tribe Brachygnathini Basilewsky, 1946
 Tribe Panagaeini Bonelli, 1810
 Tribe Peleciini Chaudoir, 1880
 Patrobinae Kirby, 1837
 Tribe Lissopogonini Zamotajlov, 2000
 Tribe Patrobini Kirby, 1837
 Paussinae Latreille, 1806
 Tribe Metriini LeConte, 1853
 Tribe Ozaenini Hope, 1838
 Tribe Paussini Latreille, 1806
 Tribe Protopaussini Gestro, 1892
 Platyninae Bonelli, 1810
 Tribe Omphreini Ganglbauer, 1891
 Tribe Platynini Bonelli, 1810
 Tribe Sphodrini Laporte, 1834
 Promecognathinae LeConte, 1853
 Tribe Axinidiini Basilewsky, 1963
 Tribe Dalyatini Mateu, 2002
 Tribe Promecognathini LeConte, 1853
 Tribe †Palaeoaxinidiini McKay, 1991
 Pseudomorphinae Hope, 1838
 Psydrinae LeConte, 1853
 Tribe Gehringiini Darlington, 1933
 Tribe Moriomorphini Sloane, 1890
 Tribe Psydrini LeConte, 1853
 Pterostichinae Bonelli, 1810
 Tribe Chaetodactylini Tschitscherine, 1903
 Tribe Cnemalobini Germain, 1911
 Tribe Cratocerini Lacordaire, 1854
 Tribe Microcheilini Jeannel, 1948
 Tribe Morionini Brullé, 1837
 Tribe Pterostichini Bonelli, 1810
 Tribe Zabrini Bonelli, 1810
 Rhysodinae Laporte, 1840
 Tribe Clinidiini R.T. & J.R.Bell, 1978
 Tribe Dhysorini R.T. & J.R.Bell, 1978
 Tribe Leoglymmiini R.T. & J.R.Bell, 1978
 Tribe Medisorini R.T. & J.R.Bell, 1987
 Tribe Omoglymmiini R.T. & J.R.Bell, 1978
 Tribe Rhysodini Laporte, 1840
 Tribe Sloanoglymmiini R.T. & J.R.Bell, 1991
 Scaritinae Bonelli, 1810
 Tribe Clivinini Rafinesque, 1815
 Tribe Corintascarini Basilewsky, 1973
 Tribe Dyschiriini Kolbe, 1880
 Tribe Salcediini Alluaud, 1930
 Tribe Scaritini Bonelli, 1810
 Siagoninae Bonelli, 1813
 Tribe Enceladini G.Horn, 1881
 Tribe Siagonini Bonelli, 1813
 Trechinae Bonelli, 1810
 Tribe Bembidarenini Maddison et al., 2019
 Tribe Bembidiini Stephens, 1827
 Tribe Pogonini Laporte, 1834
 Tribe Sinozolini Deuve, 1997
 Tribe Trechini Bonelli, 1810
 Tribe Zolini Sharp, 1886
 Xenaroswellianinae Erwin, 2007
 †Conjunctiinae Ponomarenko, 1977
 †Protorabinae Ponomarenko, 1977

Unassigned, extinct genera:
 †Agatoides Motschulsky, 1856
 †Amphoxyne Bode, 1953
 †Carabites Heer, 1852
 †Cavicarabus Hong, 1991
 †Conexicoxa Lin, 1986
 †Cymatopterus Lomnicki, 1894
 †Fangshania Hong, 1981
 †Glenopterus Heer, 1847
 †Hebeicarabus Hong, 1983
 †Megacarabus Hong, 1983
 †Meileyingia Hong, 1987
 †Miocarabus Hong, 1983
 †Neothanes Scudder, 1890
 †Procarabus Oppenheim, 1888
 †Prosynactus Bode, 1953
 †Shanwangicarabus Hong, 1985
 †Sinis Heer, 1862
 †Sinocalosoma Hong & Wang, 1986
 †Sinocaralosoma Hong, 1984
 †Sunocarabus Hong, 1987
 †Tauredon Handlirsch, 1910
 †Wuchangicarabus Hong, 1991
 †Xishanocarabus Hong, 1984
 †Yunnanocarabus Lin, 1977

References

Further reading

External links

Carabidae of the World